Panna Ghosh (born 11 November 1989) is a Bangladeshi cricketer who played for the Bangladesh women's national cricket team between 2011 and 2020. She plays as a right-arm medium bowler and right-handed batter.

Early life and background
Ghosh was born on 11 November 1989 in Rajshahi, Bangladesh.

Career

ODI career
Ghosh made her ODI debut against Ireland on 26 November 2011.

T20I career

Panna made her T20I debut against Sri Lanka on 28 October 2012. In June 2018, she was part of Bangladesh's squad that won their first ever Women's Asia Cup title, winning the 2018 Women's Twenty20 Asia Cup tournament. Later the same month, she was named in Bangladesh's squad for the 2018 ICC Women's World Twenty20 Qualifier tournament.

In October 2018, she was named in Bangladesh's squad for the 2018 ICC Women's World Twenty20 tournament in the West Indies. In January 2020, she was named in Bangladesh's squad for the 2020 ICC Women's T20 World Cup in Australia.

Asian games
Panna was a member of the team that won a silver medal in cricket against the China national women's cricket team at the 2010 Asian Games in Guangzhou, China.

References

External links
 
 

1989 births
Living people
People from Rajshahi District
Bangladeshi Hindus
Bangladeshi women cricketers
Bangladesh women One Day International cricketers
Bangladesh women Twenty20 International cricketers
Dhaka Division women cricketers
Rajshahi Division women cricketers
Western Zone women cricketers
Asian Games medalists in cricket
Cricketers at the 2010 Asian Games
Cricketers at the 2014 Asian Games
Asian Games silver medalists for Bangladesh
Medalists at the 2010 Asian Games
Medalists at the 2014 Asian Games